The HaKirya Arena (Heyhal Toto HaKirya) is an indoor sporting arena located in Ashdod, Israel. The arena opened in 2000 and is home for the Maccabi Ashdod and Maccabi Bnot Ashdod basketball clubs.

The arena has 1534 permanent seats and 666 seats in removable stands. For basketball games it has a capacity of 2,200, which is reduced to 1534 for handball matches. There are plans to build a 5,000-capacity arena near the "Lakhish park", In the north of the city.

See also
Sports in Israel

References

Sport in Ashdod
Indoor arenas in Israel
Basketball venues in Israel
Sports venues completed in 2000
Sports venues in Southern District (Israel)
2000 establishments in Israel